Agyneta tibialis is a species of sheet weaver found in Russia. It was described by Tanasevitch in 2005.

References

tibialis
Spiders described in 2005
Spiders of Russia